Léon Saint-Fort Paillard (6 July 1879 – 25 January 1928) was a French equestrian. He competed in the individual dressage event at the 1924 Summer Olympics.

References

External links
 

1879 births
1928 deaths
French male equestrians
Olympic equestrians of France
Equestrians at the 1924 Summer Olympics
Sportspeople from Mayenne
Officiers of the Légion d'honneur
20th-century French people